Bruce Hull Crump, Jr. (July 17, 1957 – March 16, 2015) was the drummer with the rock band Molly Hatchet from 1976 to 1982 (including their 1980 hit song "Flirtin' with Disaster" ) and 1984 to 1991. He also played as a member of the Canadian band Streetheart in the early 1980s, appearing on their Live After Dark recording, and joined several of his former Molly Hatchet bandmates in the band Gator Country in the mid-2000s. At his death, Crump was in the Jacksonville, Florida-based band White Rhino and the newly reformed China Sky.

Crump was the great-grandson of the Memphis politician E.H. Crump.

Personal life
Bruce was born in Memphis on July 17, 1957, to Donna (Morelock) Crump. He was predeceased by
his father, Bruce Hull Crump Sr.

He grew up between Jacksonville and St. Augustine, Fl. He was married and had four children, three boys and one girl. He lived in Midlothian, Virginia. but called "home" Richmond, Virginia.

When not involved in his band activities, he had a home business providing drum lessons, "Drum Lessons by Bruce". He was also a licensed real-estate agent and briefly a web site designer.

Illness
In July 2002, he was diagnosed with throat cancer. He died on March 16, 2015, at age 57.

References

1957 births
2015 deaths
American drummers
American Southern Rock musicians
Musicians from Memphis, Tennessee
Songwriters from Tennessee
Molly Hatchet members
Bolles School alumni